East Portlemouth is a small Devon village situated at the southern end of the Kingsbridge Estuary, on the south Devon Coast. The population of this parish taken at the 2011 census was 162. The village is sited on a hill giving views to the north to Kingsbridge and on a clear day as far as Dartmoor. There is a small ferry that runs to Salcombe in the opposite side of the estuary, and a beach that is popular with holidaymakers.

The place-name 'Portlemouth' is first attested in the Domesday Book of 1086, where it appears as Porlamuta. This is thought to derive from the Old English Portwellan-mutha, meaning 'mouth of the port well', that is to say 'mouth of the harbour stream', the village being at the mouth of a river.

The village is popular with celebrities as a second-home base, where home owners include Steve Rider, Kate Bush and Michael Parkinson.

References

Civil parishes in South Hams
Villages in South Hams